Dolní Poustevna is a railway station in the town of Dolní Poustevna, Ústí nad Labem Region, Czech Republic. The station was modernised in 2009 with the removal of old tracks and building new platforms. The station used to be a border station with Germany, where it connects to the German network at Sebnitz. The cross-border connection was closed in 1945 and reopened in July 2014. The station is now served by České dráhy in cooperation with DB Regio: the National Park Railway. This service connects Děčín and Rumburk via Bad Schandau and Sebnitz.

Train services
The station is served by the following services:
Osobní (local stopping service) Děčín hl.n. – Bad Schandau – Sebnitz – Dolní Poustevna – Mikulášovice – Rumburk

References

External links
 
 Czech Railways website
 Panoramio photo of the station

Railway stations in Ústí nad Labem Region